The list of show caves in Germany contains all 51 show caves in Germany which are hosted by the German Speleological Federation.

Background
As of 2008, there have been 51 show caves in Germany, which are hosted by the German Speleological Federation. 
A show cave is defined as any cave equipped for tourists, by having walkways or steps, fitted with lighting, or supplying gear, as examples. Show caves have regular opening times, usually with regular guided tours of about 30 to 45 minutes duration and are almost all electrically lighted. Only the Easter Cave and the Schellenberg Ice Cave still use carbide lamps. In 1884 the Olga Cave was the first German show cave to be equipped with electrical lighting and the second in the world to be thus fitted. Only the Kraus Cave in the Styria in Austria was equipped earlier, in 1883.

Not included on this list are the artificially created caverns Schlossberg Caves and Saalfeld Fee Grottos, although these are listed with the German Speleological Federation, as their operators are paying members.

Also not in the main list is Balve Cave, because it has no regular guided tours or visits. 
Included is the Dienstedt Karst Cave, which is not part of the German Speleological Federation, but fulfils all the conditions of a show cave.

The cave which had the first guided tours was Baumann's Cave in the Rübeland;  Tours of this cave were organised as early as 1646 and it was visited by Goethe. The latest to be opened as a show cave was the Autumn Labyrinth in 2009.

More than half the show caves are dripstone caves. The Wimsen Cave is the only show cave in Germany accessible by boat, for a distance of 70 metres. The Goetz Cave is the only fissure cave in the list and the largest publicly accessible cave in Europe. The Laichingen Vertical Cave is the only shaft cave that can be viewed in Germany, having a depth of 55 metres below the entrance and reaches the greatest depth of any German show cave. The Schellenberg Ice Cave is the only ice cave in Germany that can be visited. In the Barbarossa Cave, which is formed of anhydrite stone, loose layers of plaster hang like wallpaper from the ceilings and walls.

Legend 

 Name of the show cave : states the name of the show cave.
 Location: gives the location of the show cave.
 State: gives the state in which the show cave is found.
{| width="70%"
| width="4%" valign="top" |
BR 
BE 
BW 
BY 
HE 
| width="25%" valign="top" |
Brandenburg 
Berlin 
Baden-Württemberg 
Bayern 
Hesse 
| width="4%" valign="top" |
MV 
NI 
NW 
RP 
SH 
| width="25%" valign="top" |
Mecklenburg-Vorpommern 
Lower Saxony 
North Rhine-Westphalia 
Rhineland-Palatinate 
Schleswig-Holstein 
| width="4%" valign="top" |
SL 
SN 
ST 
TH
| width="25%" valign="top" |
Saarland 
Saxony 
Saxony-Anhalt 
Thuringia
|}
 Location: gives the coordinates of the show caves.
 Geological classification: states the geological type of cave. It may be a limestone cave, rock cave, karst cave or other type.
 Length (m): gives the total length of the show cave in metres including all branches.
 GR (m): gives the total length of the guided route in metres, ignoring any doubling of walkways. It does include any artificial access walkways that are not part of the total length of the cave. So the guided route may be longer than the total length of the cave.
 Height: gives the height of the entrance above sea level.
 Discovery: is the date of discovery of the show cave. Most show caves were known by the local population much earlier, because they sometimes had a natural entrance accessible on foot. In these cases the year the cave is first mentioned in the records is shown in brackets.
 Show caves : gives the start of its operation as a show cave. Subsequent problems with safety, the impact of war, financial issues or changes of owner may have led to long interruptions in its use as a show cave.
 Electr. Light: states the year when electrical lighting was first installed.
 Visitors (annual): gives the latest (2004 to 2008) average, annual visitor numbers. If the number is in brackets it indicates the recent, average number of visitors, over a different, unspecified period.

Table

Disputed caves 
Several caves are sometimes described in the literature as show caves, although they do not meet the criteria. These include the Saalfeld Fairy Grottoes and Schlossberg Caves which are not natural caverns, but mines, and the Zwiefaltendorf Limestone Cave and the Balve Cave, which have no regular guided tours.

Gallery

See also 
Cave
List of caves
 Speleology

References

Notes

Bibliography 
 Ernst Waldemar Bauer:  Wunderwelt der Höhlen. Hrsg. v. Bechtle Verlag, Esslingen 2001 
 Stephan Kempe, Wilfried Rosendahl: Höhlen – Verborgene Welten. Primus Verlag, Stuttgart 2008 
 Hans Binder, Anke Lutz, Hans Martin Lutz: Schauhöhlen in Deutschland. Hrsg. v. Aegis Verlag, Ulm 1993 
 Stephan Kempe Welt voller Geheimnisse – Höhlen. Reihe: HB Bildatlas Sonderausgabe. Hrsg. v. HB Verlags- and Vertriebs-Gesellschaft, 1997 
 Hans Binder: Herbert Jantschke: Höhlenführer Schwäbische Alb. Hrsg. v. DRW-Verlag, Leinefelden-Echterdingen 2003 
 Hans Binder: Höhlen der Schwäbischen Alb. Hrsg. v. DRW-Verlag, Leinefelden-Echterdingen 1995 
 Friedrich Herrmann: Höhlen der Fränkischen and Hersbrucker Schweiz. Hrsg. v. Verlag Hans Carl, Nürnberg 1991 
 Friedhart Knolle, Wilhelm Marbach: Bergwerke & Höhlen im Harz. Hrsg. v. Studio Volker Schadach, Goslar 1998 
 Stephan Lang: Höhlen in Franken. Wanderführer in die Unterwelt der Fränkischen Schweiz mit neuen Touren. Hrsg. v. Fachverlag Hans Carl, Nürnberg 2006 
 Stephan Lang: Höhlen in Franken. Ein Wanderführer in die Unterwelt der Hersbrucker Schweiz und des Oberpfälzer Jura. Hrsg. v. Verlag Hans Carl, Nürnberg 2002 
 Hardy Schabdach: Unterirdische Welten, Höhlen der Fränkischen- und Hersbrucker Schweiz. Hrsg. v. Verlag Reinhold Lippert, Ebermannstadt 2000 
 Helmut Seitz: Schaubergwerke, Höhlen und Kavernen in Bayern. Hrsg. Rosenheimer Verlagshaus, Rosenheim 1993 
 Volker Sklenar, K. R. Hoffmann, I. Pustal, G. Kuhn, M. Meissner, A. Nestler, R. Cebulla, R. Fohlert, J. Bodenstein, G. Holzhey: Thuringia Untertage. Hrsg. v. Thüringer Landesanstalt für Umwelt und Geologie, Jena 2006

External links 

 www.showcaves.com German Show Caves - English site 
 Show caves in Germany 
 German Speleological Federation
 Caves and cave regions www.lochstein.de 
 Cave & Karst Working Group www.arge-grabenstetten.de
 Show caves in Franconia www.freizeit.frankenjura.com 
 Show caves in Baden-Württemberg www.lhk-bw.de/schauhoehlen.htm 
 Show caves in the Swabian Jura Geo-Park www.geopark-alb.de
 Show caves in Thuringia home.arcor.de 
 Show caves in the Harz www.harz-online.de 
 Show caves in North Rhine-Westphalia www.lhk-nrw.de 
 Show caves in NRW at Geological Service of NRW www.gd.nrw.de 
Fog and Bear Cave in Baden-Württemberg monkeysandmountains.com

Germany
Show caves
Caves, show